The 2019 Nigerian House of Representatives elections in Delta State was held on February 23, 2019, to elect members of the House of Representatives to represent Delta State, Nigeria.

Overview

Summary

Results

Aniocha/Oshimili 
A total of 15 candidates registered with the Independent National Electoral Commission to contest in the election. PDP candidate Ndudi Godwin Elumelu won the election, defeating APC Adingwupu Paul Azukaego and 13 other party candidates.

Bomadi/Patani 
A total of 9 candidates registered with the Independent National Electoral Commission to contest in the election. PDP candidate Ebomo Nicholas Mutu won the election, defeating APC Eselemo Collins Okubokeyei and  other party candidates.

Burutu 
A total of 10 candidates registered with the Independent National Electoral Commission to contest in the election. PDP candidate Julius Gbabojor Pondi won the election, defeating APC Etonye Karona Ekiokeyerin and  other party candidates.

Ethiope East/Ethiope West 
A total of 18 candidates registered with the Independent National Electoral Commission to contest in the election. PDP candidate Ben Roland Igbakpa won the election, defeating APC John Agoda and  other party candidates.

Ika North East/Ika South 
A total of 13 candidates registered with the Independent National Electoral Commission to contest in the election. PDP candidate Victor Onyemaechi Nwokolo won the election, defeating APC Okoh Sebastine Edokpolor and  other party candidates.

Isoko South/Isoko North 
A total of 17 candidates registered with the Independent National Electoral Commission to contest in the election. PDP candidate Ogor Leonard Okuweh won the election, defeating APC Joel-onowakpo Thomas E. and  other party candidates.

Okpe/Sapele/Uvwie 
A total of 2 candidates registered with the Independent National Electoral Commission to contest in the election. PDP candidate Oberuakpefe Anthony Afe won the election, defeating APC Igbuya Monday Ovwigho.

Nkokwa East/Ndokwa West/ Ukwuani 
A total of 13 candidates registered with the Independent National Electoral Commission to contest in the election. PDP candidate Ossai Nicholas Ossai won the election, defeating APC Odili Paul and  other party candidates.

Ughelli North/Ughelli South/Udu 
A total of 16 candidates registered with the Independent National Electoral Commission to contest in the election. APC candidate Waive Ejiroghene Francis won the election, defeating PDP Samuel Oghenevwogaga Mariere and  other party candidates.

Warri North/Warri South/Warri South West 

A total of 12 candidates registered with the Independent National Electoral Commission to contest in the election. PDP candidate Thomas Ereyitomi won the election, defeating SDP Daniel Reyenieju Oritsegbubemi and  other party candidates.

References 

Delta State House of Representatives elections
House of Representatives
Delta State